Marion Michael Rounds (born October 24, 1954) is an American businessman and politician serving as the junior United States senator from South Dakota since 2015. A member of the Republican Party, he served as the 31st governor of South Dakota from 2003 to 2011, and in the South Dakota Senate from 1991 to 2001. In 2014, Rounds was elected to the United States Senate, succeeding retiring Democrat Tim Johnson. He was reelected in 2020 over Democratic nominee Dan Ahlers.

Early life, education, and business career
The eldest of 11 children, Rounds was born in Huron, South Dakota, the son of Joyce (née Reinartz) and Don Rounds. He has German, Belgian, Swedish and English ancestry. Rounds has lived in the state capital of Pierre since he was three years old. He was named for an uncle, Marion Rounds, who was killed in the Pacific theater during World War II. Several members of the Rounds family have been involved in state government. His father worked at various times as state director of highway safety, a staffer for Rural Electrification Administration, and executive director of the South Dakota Petroleum Council. His brother Tim Rounds is a member of the South Dakota Legislature, representing District 24, which includes Pierre.

Rounds attended South Dakota State University in Brookings, where he earned his Bachelor of Science in Political Science.

Rounds is a former partner in Fischer Rounds & Associates, an insurance and real estate firm with offices in Pierre, Rapid City, Mitchell, Watertown and Sioux Falls.

South Dakota Senate

Elections
Rounds represented District 24, which was based in Pierre. In 1990, he defeated incumbent state Senator Jacqueline Kelley, 53%–47%. He was reelected in 1992 (60%), 1994 (77%), 1996 (66%), and 1998 (75%). Rounds had to leave the Senate in 2000 because of legislative term limits South Dakota voters had passed in 1992.

Tenure
Rounds represented Hughes, Lyman, Stanley, and Sully counties. In 1993, he became Senate Minority Whip. In 1995, his peers selected him to be Senate Majority Leader.

Committee assignments
Commerce
Education
Legislative Procedure
Local Government
Retirement Laws
State Affairs
Taxation

Governor of South Dakota

Elections

2002 

As the 2002 race for governor took shape, media and political observers largely dismissed Rounds as an extreme long shot. Until late 2001, then-Congressman John Thune was the front-runner for the nomination. When Thune passed on the race to challenge Senator Tim Johnson, state Attorney General Mark Barnett and former Lieutenant Governor Steve T. Kirby became candidates.

Rounds benefited from the heated competition between Kirby and Barnett, much of which centered on ethical concerns about Kirby's personal business investments and damaged both candidates' reputations, with Barnett's campaign advertisements involving claims "so outlandish that people thought for sure that they were exaggerated or completely fabricated". By staying above the fray, Rounds won the primary by 15 points.

After winning the Republican nomination, Rounds chose State Senator Dennis Daugaard of Dell Rapids as his running mate. Their Democratic opponents were University of South Dakota President Jim Abbott of Vermillion and his running mate, former State Representative Mike Wilson of Rapid City.

Rounds was elected governor on November 5, 2002. The results were as follows:
Republicans: Rounds and Daugaard, 56.8%
Democrats: Abbott and Wilson, 41.9%
Independent: Jim Carlson and Ron Bosch, 0.7%
Libertarians: Nathan Barton and Eric Risty, 0.6%

2006 

Two Democratic candidates emerged to challenge Rounds: Jack Billion, a retired surgeon and former state legislator from Sioux Falls, and Dennis Wiese, the former president of the South Dakota Farmers Union. Billion easily won the nomination and selected Rapid City school board member Eric Abrahamson as his running mate.

The Rounds/Daugaard ticket was reelected on November 7, 2006. The results were as follows:
Republicans: Rounds and Daugaard, 61.7%
Democrats: Billion and Abrahamson, 36.1%
Constitution: Steven J. Willis and Larry Johnsen, 1.2%
Libertarians: Tom Gerber and Betty Rose Ryan, 1.0%

Tenure
Rounds served as a member of the Governors' Council at the Bipartisan Policy Center. He was the 2008 Chair of the Midwestern Governors Association.

Issues

Research centers
Rounds's 2010 Initiative established ten research centers at state-supported universities. In the program's first four years, the state's first five research centers generated an estimated $59 million in federal and private funding, with an estimated $110 million economic impact.

Abortion

On February 22, 2006, the state legislature of South Dakota passed an act banning all medical abortions except those necessary to save the mother's life. Rounds signed the act on March 6 and the ban was to have taken effect on July 1, 2006, but did not, because of a court challenge. A referendum on repealing H.B. 1215 was placed on the ballot for the November 2006 statewide election due to a petition. On May 30, over 38,000 signatures were filed, more than twice the 17,000 required to qualify. Voters repealed the law on November 7, 2006, the day of Rounds's reelection.

EB-5 Visa inquiry
During Rounds's administration, South Dakota offered green cards to foreign investors in exchange for investments in a new South Dakota beef packing plant and other economic investments through the EB-5 visa program the federal government established in 1990. After the beef packing plant went bankrupt, questions emerged about the nature of the investments and the foreign investors. Some investors received neither their EB-5 visas nor the money back from their failed investments, with no indication as to where their money went.

State officials misused funds to pay for their salaries, did not disclose that they owned companies which they gave contracts to, directed money to companies that went bankrupt and arranged for loans from unknown sources from shell companies located in tax havens. In October 2014, Rounds admitted that he had approved a $1 million state loan to beef packing plant Northern Beef shortly after learning that Secretary of Tourism and State Development Richard Benda had agreed to join the company, with Benda then getting another $600,000 in state loans that was ultimately used to pay his own salary. Benda committed suicide in October 2013, days before a possible indictment over embezzlement and grand theft charges.

3D-printed weapons
Of 3D-printed weapons, Rounds has said, “This is a new technology which you’re not going to put back into the bottle. It is there.” He has suggested creating and using new technologies, such as metal detectors that can also recognize plastic, in schools, airports and other public places.

U.S. Senate

Election

2014 

Speculation persisted that in 2014 Rounds would seek the United States Senate seat held by Tim Johnson, a Democrat who had served since 1997. Johnson opted not to run for reelection.

On November 29, 2012, Rounds launched a campaign for the seat being vacated by Johnson's retirement. He won the June 2014 Republican primary, defeating four other candidates. Early polls showed Rounds leading by a 2–1 margin against Democratic opponent Rick Weiland. October 2014 polls showed a closer three-way race between Rounds, Weiland, and independent former Senator Larry Pressler. Independent conservative former state legislator Gordon Howie was also in the race.

In November Rounds was elected with a majority of the vote. The results were:

Republican: Rounds, 50.37%
Democrat: Weiland, 29.51%
Independent: Pressler, 17.09%
Independent: Howie, 3.03%

2020

In the 2020 election, Rounds defeated Scyller Borglum to win the Republican nomination. He won the general election over Democrat Dan Ahlers with nearly 66% of the vote.

Tenure

Education
In February 2019, Rounds was one of 20 senators to sponsor the Employer Participation in Repayment Act, enabling employers to contribute up to $5,250 to their employees' student loans as a means of granting them relief and incentivizing people to apply for jobs with employers who implement the policy.

Environment
In 2017, Rounds was one of 22 senators to sign a letter to President Donald Trump urging him to withdraw the United States from the Paris Agreement. According to OpenSecrets, Rounds has received over $200,000 from oil, gas and coal interests since 2012. Rounds supported embattled Environmental Protection Agency Administrator Scott Pruitt, who had come under scrutiny because of extraordinary expenditures for personal security and luxury travel, and the appearances of ethical conflicts, defending him on Meet the Press. Calling the criticism "nitpicking," he said, “I don’t know how much of it is overblown and how much of it is accurate, to be honest.”

Criminal justice
Rounds opposed the FIRST STEP Act, a bipartisan criminal justice reform bill that Trump signed into law. The bill passed 87–12 on December 18, 2018.

Israel Anti-Boycott Act
In March 2018, Rounds co-sponsored the Israel Anti-Boycott Act (s. 720), which would make it a federal crime for Americans to encourage or participate in boycotts against Israel and Israeli settlements in the West Bank if protesting actions by the Israeli government.

Health care
Rounds opposes the Affordable Care Act (Obamacare), and has voted to repeal it. In 2019, he said he supported lawsuits seeking to overturn it.

2020 presidential election
On January 9, 2022, Rounds said that the 2020 presidential election was not stolen from Donald Trump: "[We] looked at over 60 different accusations made in multiple states. While there were some irregularities, there were none of the irregularities which would have risen to the point where they would have changed the vote outcome in a single state". Rounds said the election was fair, and added that Republicans should stop making arguments to the contrary: "If we simply look back and tell our people, 'Don't vote because there's cheating going on,' then we're going to put ourselves in a huge disadvantage. So, moving forward, let's focus on what it takes to win those elections. We can do that." Trump responded by calling Rounds a "jerk", "crazy" and "stupid" and accused him of being "woke" for acknowledging the election results.

2021 United States Capitol attack
On May 28, 2021, Rounds abstained from voting on the creation of the January 6 commission.

Committee assignments

Committee on Armed Services
Subcommittee on Airland
Subcommittee on Readiness and Management Support
Subcommittee on Seapower
Committee on Banking, Housing, and Urban Affairs
Subcommittee on Economic Policy
Subcommittee on Housing, Transportation, and Community Development (Ranking Member)
Subcommittee on Financial Institutions and Consumer Protection
Committee on Environment and Public Works
Subcommittee on Fisheries, Water and Wildlife
Committee on Veterans' Affairs

Personal life
While attending South Dakota State University, Rounds met his wife Jean, formerly of Lake Preston, South Dakota. They were married in 1978 and have four children. He is the older brother of Tim Rounds.

Rounds is a member of Sts. Peter and Paul Catholic Church of Pierre. He is also a member of numerous service clubs and community organizations, including Elks, Exchange Club, Knights of Columbus and Ducks Unlimited.

In May 2011, Rounds's alma mater, South Dakota State University, gave him an honorary doctorate for public service.

On November 2, 2021, Jean Rounds died at age 65, two years after she was diagnosed with cancer.

Electoral history

South Dakota State Senate

South Dakota Governor

U.S. Senator

References

External links

U.S. Senator Mike Rounds official U.S. Senate website
Mike Rounds for Senate

 
2010 Initiative Governor's official state economic development plan
 

|-

|-

|-

|-

1954 births
21st-century American politicians
Catholics from South Dakota
Republican Party governors of South Dakota
Living people
People from Huron, South Dakota
People from Pierre, South Dakota
Republican Party United States senators from South Dakota
Republican Party South Dakota state senators
South Dakota State University alumni
2004 United States presidential electors
2008 United States presidential electors